Stefan Hübner (born 13 June 1975 in Bielefeld, North Rhine-Westphalia) is a volleyball player from Germany, who played for the Men's National Team in the 1990s and the 2000s. He earned a total number of 226 caps for the national squad. He has been married to volleyball player Angelina Grün since 2012. The couple has two sons, Jakob (born 2014) and Benjamin (born 2017).

References

1975 births
Living people
German volleyball coaches 
German men's volleyball players
Sportspeople from Bielefeld
Volleyball players at the 2008 Summer Olympics
Olympic volleyball players of Germany